is a Japanese J-pop group formed in 2010 and is signed to Lantis. The group is also a member of the Sapporo-based music production group I've Sound.

History

Members
The group was formed by veteran singer and then-I've Sound vocalist Eiko Shimamiya, who also served as their vocal coach, in 2010. The first of the group to debut was Airi Kirishima, in the middle of 2009, when it was announced that she would perform the song "Two heaRt", the opening song of the game "Futa-Ane". The song was written by Maiko Iuchi of I've Sound and the lyrics were written by Kotoko. Since then, she performed another solo song titled "Kizuna-Endless days". The song was included in Extract, I've Sound's 7th compilation album.

In 2010, the second Larval Stage Planning member, Nami Maisaki, debuted. Her first song was "Piece of My Heart", which was an insert song used in the eroge Koi to Senkyo to Chocolate. The lyrics were written by Mami Kawada and was composed by Tomoyuki Nakazawa. The last member, Rin Asami, was previously a model signed to the agency Realize, and wanted to become a voice actress, but decided to take up singing instead. In 2011, she released her debut solo song, "Lead to the smile", which was written by Kawada and was the opening theme of the visual novel Toraba. In November of the same year, it was announced that she would be the first among the group to release a single. The single, titled "Got it!", was released at Comiket 2011.

Group
Larval Stage Planning was first announced in 2010, when it was announced that they would perform the opening theme of the game Kisagari gold star titled . The song, along with the game's ending theme titled "Send-off (Namidairo no Start Line)" were released in a single on July 18, 2010. In 2011, they made their debut with Lantis. Their second single, "Trip (innocent of D)", was released on January 25, 2012. The song was used as the opening theme of the anime High School DxD. Their third single "Sympathy" was released on July 17, 2013; the song was used as the first opening theme of the anime High School DxD New. Their fourth single "Stargazer" was released on October 29, 2014; the song is used as the opening theme to the 2014 anime series Celestial Method.

Disbandment
Larval Stage Planning became a solo project in April 2014 after the departure of Asami Rin and Maisaki Nami with Kirishima Airi as the only member. The group officially disbanded with the departure of Kirishima Airi from I've sound in July 2019.

Members

Discography

Albums

Singles

Other songs 
"Rolling Star", from Level Octave (2010)
"Send-off (Namidairo no Start Line)", from Short circuit II (2010)
"Seishun Rocket", Short circuit III premium show (with Kotoko and Kaori Utatsuki) (2010)
"Short Circuit", Short circuit III premium show (with Kotoko and Kaori Utatsuki) (2010)
"Blossomdays", Tribal Link version (June 5, 2011)
"Lillies Line", Tribal Link version (June 5, 2011)

References

External links
 
Larval Stage Planning at Lantis 

2010 establishments in Japan
Anime musical groups
I've Sound members
Musical groups established in 2010
Lantis (company) artists